Ivar Erlien Furu (born 7 May 1994) is a Norwegian footballer who plays for Gamle Oslo.

Furu was born in Trondheim, and grew up in Sunndalsøra.

Career
Furu played for Molde as a junior, he then moved to KR in 2014 on loan. He went to Byåsen in 2015. Furu signed with Ranheim in 2017.

He made his debut for Ranheim in Eliteserien in a 2–1 win against Sandefjord.

In December 2019 Furu signed with Kristiansund

Career statistics

References

1994 births
Living people
People from Sunndal
Norwegian footballers
Norway youth international footballers
Molde FK players
Byåsen Toppfotball players
Ranheim Fotball players
Kristiansund BK players
Norwegian First Division players
Eliteserien players
Norwegian Second Division players
Knattspyrnufélag Reykjavíkur players
Úrvalsdeild karla (football) players
Norwegian expatriate footballers
Expatriate footballers in Iceland
Norwegian expatriate sportspeople in Iceland
Association football defenders
Sportspeople from Møre og Romsdal